East Rockingham is an industrial suburb within the Kwinana Industrial Area, part of Perth, and located within the City of Rockingham.

History
The suburb developed as a rural community in the 1850s when various pioneers took up land and settled in the area along Mandurah Road; however, the community declined following the opening of the port at Rockingham in 1872. The Rockingham Road Board's offices were located in East Rockingham between 1905 and 1929.

The Stephenson-Hepburn Plan for Perth and Fremantle (1955) identified the strategic importance of the locality for industrial development. The suburb today contains various industrial developments, with LandCorp making plans to release more land for industrial purposes. The Water Corporation intends to construct a wastewater treatment facility in East Rockingham.

The suburb was named Challenger for a period between 1992 and 1996. It is home to two caravan parks.

Places of natural and cultural heritage significance

As of 2020, 113 places are heritage-listed in the City of Rockingham, of which seven are on the State Register of Heritage Places, with five of those located in East Rockingham.

Significant places:
 The Pines and Paradise (ruins, sites of farm cottages)
 Mona's Mount ( Key Cottage) - farm cottage
 Wheatfields - former farm cottage
 Smirk's Cottage - former farm cottage
 Sloan's Cottage - former farm cottage.
 WW2 coastal defence bunker
 East Rockingham School site
 East Rockingham Roads Board office site
 East Rockingham Pioneer Cemetery
 Hymus house and dairy
 Chesterfield inn (ruin) and dairy (ruin)
 Woodbine (a.k.a. Bell's Cottage) ruin
 Sam Chalwell's house site
 Ellendale (a.k.a. Day Cottage)
 Old Abattoir (ruin)
 Lealholm (ruin)
 Lake Cooloongup Flora and Fauna Reserve

References

 
Suburbs of Perth, Western Australia
Suburbs in the City of Rockingham